Juan Pablo Knipping Pacheco (25 March 1935 – 15 February 2021), known as Johnny Pacheco, was a Dominican musician, arranger, composer, bandleader, and record producer who in the 1970s became one of the leading exponents of salsa as well in the late 1950s called the pachanga, a blend of Cuban rhythms and Dominican merengue, which propelled him to worldwide fame and had an important role in the evolution of Latin music.

As the founder and musical director of Fania Records, Pacheco became a leading figure in the New York salsa scene in the 1960s and 1970s. He popularized the use of the term "salsa" and established the Fania All-Stars to showcase the leading artists of the genre.

Pacheco was a nine-time Grammy nominee and was awarded the Latin Grammy Lifetime Achievement Award by the Latin Recording Academy in 2005.

Early life and family
Juan Pablo Pacheco Knipping was born on 25 March 1935 in Santiago de los Caballeros, a city in the Dominican Republic. He inherited his passion for music from his father, Rafael Azarías Pacheco, who was the leader and clarinetist of the Orquesta Santa Cecilia.  One of the leading Dominican big bands of the 1930s, the Orquesta was the first to record Luis Alberti's merengue "Compadre Pedro Juan". Rafael was the grandson of a Spanish soldier who arrived during the Spanish reannexation of Santo Domingo. His mother, Octavia Knipping Rochet, was the granddaughter of a French colonist, and the great-granddaughter of a German merchant who was married to a Dominican woman born to Spanish colonists.

Pacheco and his family left the Dominican Republic for New York City when he was eleven years old.  As a child, he learned to play several instruments, including accordion, violin, flute, saxophone and clarinet. He later attended Brooklyn Technical High School, majoring in electrical engineering.  He worked in this field for a time, but eventually quit due to low salary levels. He studied percussion at the Juilliard School. From his first marriage, Pacheco had 2 daughters, Norma and Joanne. From his second marriage, Pacheco had 2 sons, Philip and Elis, who like his father excelled in the Music Business. Pacheco married his long time wife Cuqui in 1984, and they remained together until his passing.

Early music career
In 1953, Pacheco played percussion and sang with Gil Suárez's band.  In the following year, he co-founded The Chuchulecos Boys with Eddie Palmieri on piano, Barry Rogers on trombone and other future figures of renown in the New York salsa scene: Al Santiago, Mike Collazo and Ray Santos. They played at weddings and other social events. He later played percussion for several bands, including late-night shows, Lou Pérez's band The Mambaleros, and the popular orchestras of Tito Puente, Xavier Cugat and Dioris Valladares.

La Duboney
In October 1958, Pacheco met pianist Charlie Palmieri and he joined him to record the Latin jazz album Easy Does It, released by Gone Records. Pacheco played congas and bongos. Palmieri and Pacheco then formed the charanga La Duboney in 1959, where Pacheco played flute. However, he soon grew dissatisfied with his role in the group; Palmieri's name was featured on the cover of the LPs but not his, despite his role as lead arranger and co-director. Moreover, Palmieri's style was more sophisticated and less marketable, while Pacheco favored simpler son-based arrangements. After only one LP, Let's Dance the Charanga (United Artists), Pacheco left La Duboney to form his own charanga in 1960.

Pacheco y su Charanga
Pacheco formed his own band, Pacheco Y Su Charanga, in 1960.  Their first promotional single  "El güiro de Macorina"/"Óyeme mulata", received much airplay in New York from DJ Rafael Font. Al Santiago, owner of Alegre Records, decided to offer Pacheco and his band a record deal. Their debut album Pacheco Y Su Charanga Vol. 1 sold 100,000 copies within the first year of its release. Pacheco's success led to a new dance fad, the pachanga (combination of "Pacheco" and "charanga").   The music for the pachanga was heavily influenced by the uptempo merengue and cha-cha-cha hybrid style originated by Eduardo Davidson in 1959; José Fajardo's charanga popularized this style in Cuba.

Pacheco toured throughout the United States, Europe, Asia and Latin America in support of the album. Pacheco Y Su Charanga were the first Latin band to headline the Apollo Theater in New York City; they did so in 1962 and 1963.

The band's success led them to record four more albums for Alegre Records (Vols II–V).  Pachecco also reunited with Charlie Palmieri for two albums: the 1961 jam session Alegre All-Stars and the collaborative album Las charangas. However, Al Santiago encountered financial difficulties, influencing Pacheco's decision to exit Alegre Records in 1963.

Fania Records
In late 1963, Pacheco met Jerry Masucci, a lawyer, and soon they co-founded Fania Records. Pacheco was the VP, A&R creative director, and musical producer of the new label. At Fania, Pacheco launched and solidified the careers of many popular salsa artists. He named the label after the song "Fanía" by Reinaldo Bolaños, made famous by Estrellas de Chocolate in Cuba in 1960.

Pacheco y su Nuevo Tumbao
Pacheco reorganized his charanga and transformed it into a conjunto by adding trumpets instead of violins. His first album with his new band, Pacheco y su Nuevo Tumbao, was Cañonazo, the first release on Fania Records. Featuring Pete "El Conde" Rodríguez on vocals, the album was the first of many recordings by the "compadres" (literally, "godfathers"), as Pacheco and El Conde were later known. Except for the closing song on the album "Dakar, punto final", all the songs were covers, including the aforementioned "Fanía", the title track and "El kikirikí" by Evaristo Aparicio, Eduardo Angulo's "Cabio sile yeyeo", Cheo Marquetti's "Pinareño" and Walfrido Guevara's "Labrando la tierra", all by popular Cuban artists of the 1950s and 1960s.

In 1965, Pacheco recorded three albums, two of which featured Monguito el Único as lead vocalist: Pacheco at the N.Y. World's Fair and Pacheco te invita a bailar.  The third album consisted of instrumental descargas (jam sessions), and was called Pacheco, His Flute and Latin Jam. In 1966, Pacheco worked with Monguito and Chivirico Dávila to record another album, Viva África, named after the fact that Pacheco had recently toured the continent. He then reverted to the charanga format for one album, aptly titled Pacheco y su Charanga: By Popular Demand. In 1967, he recorded Sabor típico with Pete "El Conde" and Pacheco Presents Monguito, the debut album of Monguito el Único as lead artist. In 1968, he recorded the instrumental album Latin Piper and Volando bajito with El Conde on lead vocals. Pacheco and El Conde then recorded three collaborative albums: Los compadres (1970), Perfecta combinación (1971) and Tres de café y dos de azúcar (1973), as well as five reunion albums between 1980 and 1989.

Fania All-Stars

Having recorded Cuban-style jam sessions (descargas) with both the Alegre All-Stars (1961) and the Tico All-Stars (Live at the Village Gate, 1966), Pacheco decided to record a live album to showcase the Fania roster of salsa musicians. The resulting album Live at the Red Garter (1968) was a success and has been described as an "excellent and promising start for the supergroup". Among the stars featured in the concert were pianist Larry Harlow, bassist Bobby Valentín and conguero Ray Barretto. The lineup of the group varied over the years, and by the time of their second show, Live at the Cheetah (1971), many members had changed.

Pacheco y su Tumbao Añejo
In 1974, Pacheco replaced El Conde (who went on a successful solo career) with Héctor Casanova and renamed his band Pacheco y su Tumbao Añejo ("Pacheco and his old tumbao", as opposed to his previous band "the new tumbao"). They released El maestro in 1975 and El artista in 1977. However, Pacheco's focus during the 1970s, apart from the All-Stars, was a series of collaborative albums between members of the label, including himself. He collaborated with Celia Cruz, Justo Betancourt, Papo Lucca, Pupi Legarreta, Luis "Melón" Silva, Celio González and José Fajardo, among others. With Héctor Casanova he released another album, Los amigos, in 1979. After his various reunion albums with El Conde, including the Nuevo Tumbao 25th anniversary album Celebration, Pacheco released ¡Sima! in 1993, his last studio album.

Legacy
Pacheco recorded and composed over 150 songs. Among them are "Mi Gente", "La Dicha Mia", "Quítate Tú" (Pa’ Ponerme Yo), "Acuyuye," "El Rey de la Puntualidad," Tito Puente's "El Número Cien," and Celia Cruz's Celia y Tito. Pacheco has also been an inspiration to the younger generations. For example, rap artist Mangu invited him to collaborate on an album entitled Calle Luna y Calle Sol; Pacheco arranged the album, sang in the chorus, and played the flute. Pacheco also produced music for feature films.  The first film he worked on was the 1972 documentary Our Latin Thing; this was also the first film about the influence of salsa on Latino culture in New York City.  His second film Salsa released in 1974. In the 1980s, he composed the scores for Mondo New York and Something Wild. The latter was a collaboration with David Byrne, the lead singer of the group Talking Heads. Several tracks that he arranged, produced, and/or performed were included on the soundtrack of the 1992 Warner Brothers film, The Mambo Kings.

Pacheco performed in the 1988 AIDS benefit concert "Concierto Por La Vida", held at Avery Fisher Hall. He also collaborated with the Hispanic Federation Relief Fund to raise money for the victims of Hurricane Georges. Pacheco established the Johnny Pacheco Scholarship Fund in 1994 for college students in the New York metropolitan area.

The Johnny Pacheco Latin Music and Jazz Festival is an annual event that is held in mid-November at Lehman College.

Awards and recognition
Pacheco earned nine Grammy nominations and ten gold records. His contributions to Latin Music have been recognized throughout his career.

In 1996, the then-President of the Dominican Republic, Joaquín Balaguer, conferred the prestigious Presidential Medal of Honor on Pacheco. A year later, Pacheco was the recipient of the Bobby Capó Lifetime Achievement Award, awarded by New York Governor George Pataki. In addition, Pacheco received the First International Dominican Artist Award at the Casandra Awards. In June 1996, Johnny Pacheco became the first Latin music producer to receive the National Academy of Recording Arts & Sciences (NARAS) Governor's Award.

In 1998, Pacheco was among the first group of artists inducted into International Latin Music Hall of Fame (ILMHF). The ILMHF awarded him the Lifetime Achievement Award in 2002.

In 2004, Pacheco was awarded the American Society of Composers, Authors and Publishers, ASCAP Silver Pen Award.

On 5 June 2005, Pacheco was honored by Union City, New Jersey with a star on the Walk of Fame at Union City's Celia Cruz Park.

In 2005, the Latin Academy of Recording Arts & Sciences awarded Johnny Pacheco with its Lifetime Achievement Award at that years Latin Grammys.

In 2007, Pacheco was portrayed by Nelson Vasquez in the movie El Cantante, starring Marc Anthony and Jennifer Lopez.

On 24 March 2009, Pacheco was awarded "El Soberano", the highest distinction given by the Association of Art Columnists of the Dominican Republic.

In August 2020, Johnny Pacheco's composition "Celia y Tito" by Tito Puente and Celia Cruz was featured in the 4th-season finale of the NBC TV network program "World of Dance" which is produced and judged by international film and recording star Jennifer Lopez.

Death
A resident of Fort Lee, New Jersey, Pacheco died at Holy Name Medical Center in Teaneck on 15 February 2021, aged 85, after being admitted to the hospital with pneumonia-related complications.

Discography

As leader

Alegre Records
  Pacheco y Su Charanga, Vol. 1 (1960)
  Pacheco y su Charanga, Vol. 2 (1961)
  The Alegre All-Stars, Vol. 1 (1961)
  Que Suene la Flauta, Vol. 3 (1962)
  Suavito, Vol. 4 (1962)
  Spotlight on Pacheco, Vol. 5 (1963)
  Las Charangas (1963)

Fania Records
  Cañonazo (1964)
  Pacheco at the N.Y. World's Fair (1964)
  Pacheco, His Flute and Latin Jam (1965)
  By Popular Demand (1966)
  Viva África (1966)
  Pacheco Te Invita a Bailar (1967)
  Sabor Típico (1967)
  Pacheco presents Monguito (1968)
  Volando Bajito (1968)
  Los Dinámicos (1970)
  La Perfecta Combinación (1971)
  Los Compadres (1972)
  Tres de Café y Dos de Azúcar (1973)
  Celia & Johnny (1974)
  Tremendo Caché (1975)
  El Maestro (1976)
  Recordando el Ayer (1977)
  The Artist (1977)
  Llegó Melón (1977)
  Eternos con Celia Cruz (1978)
  Champ (1980)
  Los Amigos (1980)
  Las Tres Flautas with Pupi Legarreta and José Fajardo (1980)
  El Zorro de Plata y El Flaco de Oro (1981)
  De Nuevo Los Compadres (1983)
  Jícamo (1985)
  Salsobita (1987)
  Celebración (1989)
  ¡Sima! (1993)
  De Nuevo with Celia Cruz
  Flying High
  Los Dos Mosqueteros
  La Crema
  Sabrosura
  Los Distinguidos
  De Película (Rolando Laserie)
  Pacheco y Fajardo
  Celia, Johnny y Pete
  Entre Amigos

Compilations
 Había Una Vez (Once Upon a Time) (1973)
 10 Great Years (1973)
 Lo Mejor de Pacheco (The Best of Pacheco) (1974)
 Introducing... (1989)
 Pacheco's Party (1994)
 Johnny Pacheco (2000)
 The Best of Johnny Pacheco (2001)
 Lo Mejor (2004)
 Reserva Musical (2008)

As sideman
With Melanie
Brand New Key (Neighborhood, 1971)
With George Benson
Tell It Like It Is (A&M/CTI, 1969)
With Kenny Burrell
Blues - The Common Ground (Verve, 1968)
Night Song (Verve, 1969)
With J. J. Johnson
Goodies (RCA, 1965)
With Johnny Lytle
A Man and a Woman (Solid State, 1967)
With Les McCann
Les McCann Plays the Hits (Limelight, 1966)
With McCoy Tyner
McCoy Tyner Plays Ellington (Impulse!, 1964)

With Kai Winding 
Dance to the City Beat (Columbia, 1959)

With the Fania All-Stars

 Live at the Red Garter Vol. 1
 Live at the Red Garter Vol. 2
 Live at the Cheetah Vol. 1
 Live at the Cheetah Vol. 2
 Live at Yankee Stadium Vol. 1
 Live at Yankee Stadium Vol. 2
 Live in Africa
 Live in San Juan – 1973
 A Tribute to Tito Rodríguez
 Live in Japan – 1976
 Delicate and Jumpy
 Spanish Fever
 Rhythm Machine
 Crossover
 Commitment
 Viva La Charanga
 Latin Connection
 Lo Que Pide La Gente
 Bamboleo
 California Jam
 Havana Jam
 Guasasa
 Social Change
 Bravo
 The Perfect Blend
 Viva Colombia – The Cali Concert
 Live in Puerto Rico – 1993

Filmography 

Our Latin Thing (Fania 1972)
Salsa (Fania, 1974)
Celia cruz and the Fania All Stars In Africa (Fania, 1993)
Live (Fania, 1995)
 Soul Power (2009)

See also 
Music of Latin America
Music of New York City
Latin Jazz
Charanga (Cuba)
Guaguancó
Son cubano
Salsa
Afro-Cuban jazz
List of people from the Dominican Republic

References

External links 

 Official website of Johnny Pacheco
 Music Publishing Administrator for Johnny Pacheco Music ASCAP and Sima Publishing BMI c/o Herman Rodriguez-Bajandas www.fonico.mobi
 
 

1935 births
2021 deaths
People from Santiago de los Caballeros
Dominican Republic people of French descent
Dominican Republic people of German descent
Dominican Republic people of Spanish descent
Charly Records artists
Dominican Republic musicians
Fania Records artists
Güiro players
People from Fort Lee, New Jersey
Salsa musicians
Latin Grammy Lifetime Achievement Award winners
Latin music record producers
Latin music composers
Deaths from pneumonia in New Jersey
Dominican Republic emigrants to the United States